This article concerns the period 59 BC – 50 BC.

Significant people
 Julius Caesar, Roman politician and general (lived 100–44 BC)
 Pharaoh Cleopatra VII of Egypt (lived 70/69–30 BC, reigned 51–30 BC)—meets Julius Caesar and later becomes teenager Pharaoh, after her brothers die young.
 Pompey, Roman general (lived 106 BC–48 BC)
 Marcus Licinius Crassus, Roman politician and general (lived 115–53 BC)
 Marcus Tullius Cicero, Roman politician (lived 106–43 BC)
 Vercingetorix, Chieftain of the Arverni (d. 46 BC)
 Cassivellaunus, British war-leader
 Ariovistus, German king
 Commius, Gaulish king
 Phraates III, King of Parthia (reigned 70–57 BC)
 Mithridates III, king of Parthia and Media (reigned 57–54 BC)
 Orodes II, king of Parthia (reigned 57–38 BC)
 Surena, Parthian general (lived 84–54 BC)
 Bak Hyeokgeose, king of Silla in Korea (69 BC–AD 4, reigned 57 BC–AD 4)

References